Prehistoric Life is a non-fiction encyclopedia. The full title of the book is Prehistoric Life: The Definitive Visual History of Life on Earth. The 512-page book was published by Dorling Kindersley in 2009.

External links
Prehistoric Life: The Definitive Visual History of Life on Earth at Amazon.com
 DK.com - Prehistoric Life - DK Publishing
 DK Canada - Prehistoric Life - Dorling Kindersley

Paleontology books
Encyclopedias of science
2009 non-fiction books
DK (publisher) books